WLVZ is a radio station on 107.1 FM in Collins, Mississippi, US serving the Hattiesburg, Mississippi, area. The station serves as the Hattiesburg-area transmitter for the K-Love Christian radio network.

History
On January 10, 1977, Covington County Broadcasters, Inc., filed for a new FM radio station on 101.7 MHz in Collins. The Federal Communications Commission granted the construction permit on February 13, 1978. The station went on air that August 15 and immediately adopted a format including country music during the day and adult contemporary in the afternoon and at night. Covington County Broadcasters was owned by Ottis Wolverton and operated by the Blakeney brothers. By 1984, however, WKNZ had gone all-country. Wolverton acquired WBKH in Hattiesburg in 1988. Both stations were sold the next year to Southern Air Communications, owned by Bruce Easterling, in a $648,000 transaction; the new owners flipped WKNZ to oldies.

Financial problems grounded Southern Air in 1993. The Associated Press sued Southern Air that year for unpaid wire service bills in 1990. By that time, however, WKNZ's ownership was already in the process of changing, as Wolverton repurchased the FM outlet. Southern Air owed Covington County Broadcasters, the former licensee, $423,000.

As part of a reassignment of FM allotments in several Mississippi communities approved in 1991, WKNZ had been relocated to 107.1 MHz; the frequency change came into effect on August 26, 1994, by which time WKNZ was again a country music outlet.

After being purchased by Thomas F. McDaniels under the name Sunbelt Broadcasting Corporation, WKNZ switched to classic rock "Zoo 107" on December 29, 1994. The station became a partner of the Hattiesburg Zoo, which was its new namesake; it sponsored the zoo's name-a-zebra contest in 1996.

Radio Broadcasters, controlled by Ken Rainey and owners of WMXI, acquired WKNZ and WXHB in 2000 for $690,000. The station's format remained unchanged until the station was sold in 2005 to the Educational Media Foundation and converted into a K-Love transmitter. The station immediately dropped its programming, including sports programming, on April 1, 2005.

References

Radio stations established in 1978
1978 establishments in Mississippi
K-Love radio stations
Educational Media Foundation radio stations
LVZ